Bijelo Polje Municipality (Montenegrin: Opština Bijelo Polje, Општина Бијело Поље) is one of the municipalities of Montenegro, and is located in northeastern Montenegro, in the Lim river valley, being part of Raška region. Its administrative centre is town of Bijelo Polje. It covers an area of 924 km2, and had a population of 46,051 at the 2011 census.

Transport

Road
Bijelo Polje is connected to the rest of Montenegro by two major roads. It is situated on the main road connecting Montenegro's coast and Podgorica with northern Montenegro and Serbia (E65, E80).

Rail
Bijelo Polje also has a train station along the Belgrade–Bar railway. It is the last station in Montenegro for northbound trains heading for Belgrade, and it serves as a regional train station.

Local parliament

Population
According to the 2011 census, the municipality has a population of 46,051. Administrative centre of the municipality town of Bijelo Polje itself has 15,400 citizens.

Ethnicity
Source: Statistical Office of Montenegro - MONSTAT, Census 2011

Settlements

Babaići
Barice
Bijedići
Bijelo Polje
Bliškovo
Bojišta
Boljanina
Boturići
Cerovo
Crhalj
Crniš
Crnča
Dobrakovo
Dobrinje
Dolac
Dubovo
Džafića Brdo
Femića Krš
Godijevo
Goduša
Grab
Grančarevo
Gubavač
Ivanje
Jablanovo
Jabučno
Jagoče
Kanje
Kičava
Korita
Kostenica
Kostići
Kovren
Kukulje
Laholo
Lazovići
Lekovina
Lijeska
Lješnica
Lozna
Loznica
Majstorovina
Metanjac
Mioče
Mirojevići
Mojstir
Mokri Lug
Muslići
Nedakusi
Negobratina
Njegnjevo
Obrov
Okladi
Orahovica
Osmanbegovo Selo
Ostrelj
Pali
Pape
Pavino Polje
Pećarska
Pobretići
Pod
Potkrajci
Potrk
Požeginja
Prijelozi
Pripčići
Radojeva Glava
Radulići
Rakita
Rakonje
Rasovo
Rastoka
Ravna Rijeka
Resnik
Rodijelja
Sadići
Sela
Sipanje
Sokolac
Srđevac
Stožer
Stubo
Tomaševo
Trubine
Ujniče
Unevine
Voljavac
Vrh
Zaton
Zminac
Čeoče
Čokrlije
Đalovići
Šipovice
Žiljak
Žurenax

Gallery

References

 
Municipalities of Montenegro